Robert Hilmer Hegman (born February 26, 1958), is an American former Major League Baseball player who played in  with the World Series champion Kansas City Royals. Hegman attended St. Cloud State University.

His one big-league game came on August 8, 1985, when he replaced George Brett in the lineup for the ninth inning. Greg Pryor, who had been playing second base, moved over to third base to replace Brett defensively, while Hegman took his position at second base. He played just one inning without a fielding chance.

Later when asked if he received a World Series ring, Hegman replied, "Heck, all I got was a $100 check. I should have kept it and framed it, but I had to eat".

He remained with the Royals for 16 seasons (1987–2002) after his playing career ended and served ten seasons (1993–2002) as the club's director or senior director of minor league operations.  He was dismissed by then-Royals general manager Allard Baird in July 2002 in a streamlining of the Kansas City front office.

He later worked as a Major League scout for the Minnesota Twins.

References

Further reading

External links
, or Retrosheet

1958 births
Living people
Baseball players from Minnesota
Charleston Royals players
Jacksonville Suns players
Kansas City Royals executives
Kansas City Royals players
Major League Baseball farm directors
Major League Baseball second basemen
Memphis Chicks players
Minnesota Twins scouts
Omaha Royals players
St. Cloud State Huskies baseball players
People from Springfield, Minnesota